KWCC-FM (89.5 FM) is an American non-commercial educational radio station licensed to serve Woodland Park, Colorado. The station's broadcast license is held by 91.5 KRCC, owned by Colorado College.

KWCC-FM repeats the main KRCC signal content found at 91.5 FM.

History
In October 2007, Grace Public Radio applied to the U.S. Federal Communications Commission (FCC) for a construction permit for a new broadcast radio station. The FCC granted this permit on May 7, 2008, with a scheduled expiration date of May 7, 2011. The new station was assigned call sign "KILE-FM" on August 27, 2008. After multiple modifications, construction and testing were completed in April 2011 and the station was granted its broadcast license on May 11, 2011.

As of 2011, KILE-FM broadcast an oldies music format during the day and soft jazz at night.

In May 2017, the station was sold by Grace Public Radio to Colorado College for $24,000 to serve as a repeater of its NPR affiliated station KRCC. The sale was consummated on June 16, 2017, at which point the call letters were changed to KWCC-FM.

Construction permit
On December 26, 2012, KILE-FM applied for an FCC construction permit to change the directional pattern of the antenna and increase HAAT to -132 meters.

References

External links
 91.5 KRCC main website

WCC-FM
Oldies radio stations in the United States
Jazz radio stations in the United States
Teller County, Colorado
Radio stations established in 2011
2011 establishments in Colorado
Colorado College